Léré Airport  is a public use airport located near Léré, Mayo-Kebbi Ouest, Chad.

See also
List of airports in Chad

References

External links
 Airport record for Léré Airport at Landings.com

Airports in Chad
Mayo-Kebbi Ouest Region